Hull Fair is Europe's largest travelling funfair, which comes to Kingston upon Hull, England for one week from 5 pm on Friday to 11 pm of the Saturday eight days later, encompassing 11 October each year. The fair is open every day between these days except Sunday. Unlike small local fairs, Hull Fair attracts rides, attractions, and travellers from a wide variety of different regions from around the country.

History
Hull Fair received its first Royal Charter in 1279, although it had operated informally prior to that time.

The fair is one of the city's biggest traditions, as well as one of its oldest events. Carrying on with such tradition, the fair is opened by the Lord Mayor of Hull on the opening evening, normally at 5 pm.

Local tradition states that the changing of the calendar in 1751 led the locals to believe the loss of eleven days affected their fair. “Give us back our eleven days,” was the cry as an enraged mob charged around the streets of Hull, calling for the return of their eleven-day festivities which they believed to have been lost due to the calendar change. The outraged masses got their wish and from that year onwards 11 October, or the Friday nearest to it, became the official date for Hull Fair.

The fair is held on land on the east side of Walton Street, situated next to the MKM Stadium and the Tigers Trust Arena.

Cancellations
There was no fair from 1915 to 1918 due to the First World War. It was also not held between 1940 and 45 due to the Second World War. It was cancelled in 2020 due to the COVID-19 pandemic. The fair returned in full under its established calendar in October 2021.

Incidents 
A 17-year-old student was seriously injured in a fall from the Bomber ride, after not being properly fastened into her seat. The incident, which took place in October 2002, resulted in the student suffering head and spinal injuries, two broken legs, as well as an injured hip and pelvis.

In October 2008, the elastic cord of a reverse bungee ride broke whilst it was in use. Although people were on the ride when it happened, nobody suffered any injuries.

On 13 October 2017, a fault with the Power Tower ride at Hull Fair left more than thirty riders, aged between nine and 60, trapped about 70 ft (21m) in the air for five hours. Firefighters had to use an aerial platform to rescue those stuck, and it was the third time that the ride had broken down since the fair had opened that year. Riders were given blankets to keep them warm and got off at approximately midnight. That same year, a video was uploaded online showing a young boy managing to climb over and stand on a safety chain used to pin back riders, whilst on the Meteorite ride.

On 7 October 2019, a woman was flung from a ride, the Airmaxxx 360. The bar on her carriage failed and she was ejected from the ride, landing on a teenager boy and hitting another ride. She suffered non-life-threatening injuries to her face, abdomen, and leg, while the teenager suffered minor injuries to his foot. The two rides were taped off at the time of the incident and closed.

References

External links

 Aerial video of the 2019 Hull Fair at night
 Hull Fair Project
 The history of Hull Fair Hull City Council

Annual fairs
Tourist attractions in Kingston upon Hull
Fairs in England
Annual events in the United Kingdom
October events
Events in Yorkshire
Festivals established in 1278